The governor of the Punjab was head of the British administration in the province of the Punjab. In 1849 the East India Company defeated the Sikh Empire and annexed the Punjab region. The governor-general of India, Lord Dalhousie, implemented a three-member Board of Administration to govern the province. The Board of Administration was abolished in 1853 and replaced by the office of chief commissioner. Following the liquidation of the East India Company and the transfer of its assets to the British Crown, the office of lieutenant-governor was instituted in 1859. This lasted until it was replaced by the office of governor in the aftermath of the Montagu–Chelmsford Reforms.

In 1947, the British Raj came to an end and the countries of India and Pakistan were created. The Punjab was partitioned into West Punjab and East Punjab, with the former joining Pakistan and the latter India. In Pakistan, the first governor of West Punjab was Sir Francis Mudie. In 1955, West Punjab was dissolved, and became Punjab province. In 1966, East Punjab was divided into the present-day Indian states of Haryana, Himachal Pradesh and Punjab.

List of Heads of the Punjab (1849–1947)

See also
 Governor of Punjab, Pakistan
 List of governors of Punjab (India)
 List of governors-general of India

References